Azanus natalensis, the Natal babul blue or Natal spotted blue, is a butterfly of the family Lycaenidae. It is found in the Afrotropical realm.

Description and habits
The wingspan is 23–27 mm in males and 24–30 mm in females. Its flight period is year-round but mainly between September and May. The larvae feed on Acacia species.

Gallery

References

Butterflies described in 1887
Butterflies of Africa
natalensis
Taxa named by Roland Trimen